Southeast Asian English is the English spoken in Southeast Asia, namely Singapore English (similar and related to British English), Malaysian English (similar and related to British English), Brunei English (similar and related to British English), Philippine English (similar and related to American English), Tinglish, Myanmar English (similar and related to British English) and Australian English in Christmas Island and Cocos (Keeling) Islands (similar and related to British English).

The Malay area group (Malaysian, Singaporean, Bruneian) are based on British English, and have been influenced by Malay and Chinese.

Notes

Languages of Southeast Asia
Dialects of English